Andrew Thomas (born 14 December 1977) is an English football manager and former footballer. He is currently manager of Welsh Premier League club Airbus UK Broughton.

Career

Playing career
Thomas was born in Chester, and began his career as a trainee with Wrexham, playing in the 1995-96 UEFA Cup Winners' Cup against FC Petrolul Ploieşti. He turned professional in August 1996, but failed to make any further first team appearances and was released in 1997. He joined Connah's Quay Nomads and began a lengthy career in Welsh football. He moved to Cwmbran Town in the 1999–2000 season, but played just twice before returning to Connah's Quay. In 2001, he joined Newtown, moving to Airbus UK Broughton in August 2003. At the end of this first season with Airbus, they won the Cymru Alliance and with it promotion to the Welsh Premier League. He spent the 2005–06 season on a dual registration with both Airbus UK and Cymru Alliance side Halkyn United. He retired in 2007.

Coaching career
In November 2007, Thomas was appointed as assistant manager of Airbus UK. In August 2016, Thomas was appointed interim manager of Airbus UK before taking permanent charge in September 2016.

Career statistics

Managerial record
.

Honours

Player
Airbus UK
 Cymru Alliance (1): 2003–04

References

External links
 Welsh Premier League Profile

Living people
1977 births
Sportspeople from Chester
English footballers
Wrexham A.F.C. players
Connah's Quay Nomads F.C. players
Newtown A.F.C. players
Airbus UK Broughton F.C. players
Cwmbrân Town A.F.C. players
Halkyn United F.C. players
Cymru Premier players
Cymru Premier managers
Airbus UK Broughton F.C. managers
English football managers
Association football defenders